Jordan Andrew Hulls (born April 16, 1990) is an American former professional basketball player. He played college basketball for Indiana University, where he currently works as team and recruiting coordinator.

Personal
Hulls is from Bloomington, Indiana and majored in exercise science. John Hulls, his grandfather, came to Indiana from Army with Bob Knight in 1971 and served on his staff as a shooting coach. Hulls's sister Kaila played basketball for the Indiana women's team.

Early career and high school
Hulls began receiving basketball instruction at an early age from his father and grandfather. He was not allowed to shoot three-pointers until the seventh grade, when his dad decided he was strong enough to shoot from that far without muddling his form. He played three years on varsity for Bloomington High School South, playing in 73 games and winning 66 of them. His senior year he led his team to a Class 4A IHSAA state championship and a 26–0 perfect season. The team earned a No. 3 national ranking by USA Today.  Hulls led his team in scoring (15.8-point average), assists (5.2) and steals (2.6). Hulls graduated from high school in 2009 and finished with a 3.94 GPA.

Following the end of his senior season, Hulls was named Indiana Mr. Basketball, the state's highest honor for high school players.  He became the 25th Indiana Mr. Basketball to play for the Hoosiers. He was also named first team All-State and the Gatorade Player of the Year in Indiana. Hulls also played in the Indiana/Kentucky All-Star series and on the Indiana Elite One AAU squad. According to ESPN Hulls was the 31st best point guard in the class. Scout.com had him rated 80th nationally and 9th at his position, while Rivals.com had him slotted 106th in the country and 17th at his position. Sporting News tabbed him as the top leader in the 2009 class.

College career
On May 20, 2008, Hulls committed to play for Indiana University, turning down an offer from Purdue. Of his commitment to Indiana, he said, "Being a hometown kid, that definitely factored into it. Being a part of bringing the program back to what it used to be appeals to me." Hulls also noted he had been a lifelong Hoosier fan, in part because of his family's connections to the program.

In his freshman year at Indiana, the 2009–10 season, Hulls played in all 31 games and started 17, including the final nine games of the season. He led the team with 47 made 3-pointers and a .402 shooting percentage from behind the arc. His .402 3-point percentage was the fifth-highest in the conference overall and the best amongst conference freshmen. He hit 8-of-12 threes for a career-high 24 points in a career-high 44 minutes in overtime win against Northwestern. His eight threes in that game are the second-most in a single game in Indiana history.

In his sophomore year at Indiana, the 2010–11 season, Hulls was the only player to start in 32 games. He finished ninth in the Big Ten in three-point field goal percentage (41.4) and ended the season by making a school record 41 straight free throw attempts, including all 35 in league play. At the end of the season he was named to the Academic All-Big Ten team.

In his junior year at Indiana, the 2011–12 season, Hulls averaged 11.5 points and 3.2 assists in 30.1 minutes per game. He shot 50.4% from the field, 49.3% from the three-point line, and 89.9% from the free throw line. Hulls improved in nearly every statistical category during the season, and made more big shots in his career than any other Indiana player on the team. The Hoosiers earned a number four seed in the 2012 NCAA Tournament and defeated New Mexico State in the second round. After defeating VCU in the third round, the Hoosiers lost in the Sweet Sixteen to Kentucky, the eventual national champions.

In his senior year at Indiana, the 2012–13 season, Hulls established himself as a leader on a team that finished the regular season as outright Big Ten champions. He led the Big Ten in 3-point field goal percent shooting at 48.7% and averaged 10.5 points, 3.0 assists and 2.5 rebounds per game. Further, the Hoosiers outscored opponents by 439 points with him on the floor, the best plus-minus rating for an individual player in the nation. Hulls earned All-Big Ten Honorable Mention honors from the coaches and media, a 2012–13 Academic All-America selection, and was a 2012–13 Senior CLASS Award winner.

Professional career
After going undrafted in the 2013 NBA Draft, Hulls signed his first professional contract with Energa Czarni of the Polish Basketball League.

On September 3, 2014, he signed with Sigal Prishtina of the Kosovo Basketball Superleague for the 2014–15 season.

On May 30, 2015, he signed with Limburg United of the Belgian League.

On July 8, 2016, he signed with Eisbären Bremerhaven of the Basketball Bundesliga.

On June 18, 2018, Hulls signed with s.Oliver Würzburg. He won the FIBA Europe Cup Fan Vote MVP.

On October 12, 2020, he has signed with MHP Riesen Ludwigsburg of the Basketball Bundesliga (BBL).

On June 6, 2022, MHP Riesen Ludwigsburg announced the retirement of Hulls as professional basketball player. He currently works as team and recruiting coordinator for Indiana University in his hometown, where he had played earlier.

The Basketball Tournament (TBT) (2015–2017) 
In the summers of 2015, '16, and 2017, Hulls played in The Basketball Tournament on ESPN for team Armored Athlete.  He competed for the $2 million prize, and for team Armored Athlete in 2017, he averaged 7.5 points per game.  Hulls helped take team Armored Athlete in 2017 to the West Regional Championship, where they lost to Team Challenge ALS 75–63. In TBT 2018, Hulls averaged 8.7 points, 2 rebounds, and 1.3 steals per game for Armored Athlete. They reached the Super 16 before falling to Boeheim's Army.

References

External links 
 Belgian League profile
 Profile at Eurobasket.com

1990 births
Living people
American expatriate basketball people in Belgium
American expatriate basketball people in Germany
American expatriate basketball people in Kosovo
American expatriate basketball people in Poland
American men's basketball players
Basketball players from Indiana
Czarni Słupsk players
Eisbären Bremerhaven players
Indiana Hoosiers men's basketball players
KB Prishtina players
Limburg United players
Point guards
Riesen Ludwigsburg players
S.Oliver Würzburg players
Sportspeople from Bloomington, Indiana